Fujimoto (藤本, 藤元) is a Japanese surname. Notable people with the surname include:

, professional baseball player
, baseball pitcher
 George I. Fujimoto, American chemist
 Jack Fujimoto, Japanese-American educator
 James Fujimoto, Japanese-American researcher at MIT
, Japanese football player
, purported former sushi chef to Kim Jong Il
, Japanese actor and entertainer
, a Japanese convict
, Japanese musician
, Japanese ice hockey player
, Japanese ice hockey player
, Japanese footballer
, Japanese baseball manager
Shihachi Fujimoto, Japanese photographer
Shun Fujimoto, Japanese gymnast
Sou Fujimoto, Japanese architect
Tak Fujimoto, Japanese-American cinematographer
Takahiro Fujimoto, Japanese medley swimmer
, Japanese manga artist
Tsukasa Fujimoto, Japanese professional wrestler and actress
, Japanese footballer
, Japanese basketball player
, Japanese voice actor

Fictional characters
Fujimoto, character in the film Ponyo on the Cliff by the Sea
Abby Fujimoto, character in the television series Flight 29 Down
Kiyokazu Fujimoto, protagonist of the manga series Kobato
Fujimoto, antagonist of the games "Octodad" and "Octodad: Dadliest Catch"

See also
Fujimoto Photo Industries Co. Ltd.

Japanese-language surnames